
Gmina Karnice is a rural gmina (administrative district) in Gryfice County, West Pomeranian Voivodeship, in north-western Poland.

Villages
Gmina Karnice contains the villages and settlements of Cerkwica, Ciećmierz, Czaplice, Czaplin Mały, Czaplin Wielki, Dreżewo, Drozdówko, Drozdowo, Gocławice, Gościmierz, Janowo, Karnice, Konarzewo, Kusin, Lędzin, Modlimowo, Mojszewo, Niczonów, Niedysz, Ninikowo, Niwy, Paprotno, Pogorzelica, Skalno, Skrobotowo, Trzeszyn, Węgorzyn, Witomierz and Zapole.

Neighbouring gminas
Gmina Karnice is bordered by the gminas of Gryfice, Rewal, Świerzno and Trzebiatów.

References
Polish official population figures 2006

Karnice
Gryfice County